The Task Force is a light and medium duty truck series by Chevrolet, their first major redesign since 1947.  Its GMC counterpart was the GMC Blue Chip series. It was billed as being more stylish compared to the earlier Advance Design Series while still maintaining its rugged durability. First available on March 25, 1955, these trucks were sold with various minor changes over the years until 1959, when the C and K Series trucks replaced the Task Force models for 1960.

History 

GM redesigned their truck line for the 2nd half of 1955, but sold both designs that year; the older design became known as the 1st series, and the newer design as the 2nd Series. Commercial trucks and various other heavy duty models were also available. Chevrolet and GMC named their new series independently.

     
The cousins were differentiated by running gear and interiors; Chevrolet used Chevrolet engines, and GMC used GMC inline Sixes and Pontiac V8s (Oldsmobile V8s in the Heavy-Duty trucks).

For the first time in GM history, trucks were available with optional power steering, power brakes, and V8s. A column-shifted 3-speed manual transmission was standard, with an optional floor-shift-4 speed manual or Hydramatic automatic. The electrical system got an upgrade to 12 volts.  

The new body featured the truck industry’s first wrap-around windshield, and an optional wrap around rear window for Deluxe cab models. Headlights became integrated into the fenders. The cab got taller, and in-cab steps replaced the running boards of previous models. A "step" between the cab and rear fender aided access to items inside the pickup bed. Redesigned bed fenders were carried through the next generation body that ended in 1966.

Differences

1955 Second Series: First year for new body style. Fenders have single headlights and a one-piece emblem is mounted below horizontal line on fender. 
The GMC inline-6 remained 6V for 1955 only. 

1956: Wider hood emblem. Two-piece fender emblems are mounted above horizontal fender line. Last year for eggcrate grille.

1957: Only year for more open grille. Hood is flatter with two spears on top, similar to the 1957 Bel Air. Fender emblems are still above fender line, but are now oval-shaped, as opposed to previous versions in script.

1958: All light-duty trucks are now called "Apache", medium-duty trucks called "Viking", and heavy-duty trucks called "Spartan". First year for factory-equipped air conditioning. Significant redesign of front end, featuring a shorter/full-width grille, four Headlights instead of the previous two, and Parking lights are now in the grille instead of being in the front of the fender. The hood is similar to 1955/1956 models, but with a flat "valley" in the middle. For 1958, GM was promoting their fiftieth year of production, and introduced Anniversary models for each brand (Cadillac, Buick, Oldsmobile, Pontiac, and Chevrolet); the trucks also received similar attention to appearance, but staying essentially durable, with minimal adornment.

1959: Minimal changes from 1958, the most apparent was a larger and more ornate hood emblem and redesigned badging on the fenders. This was the last year that the NAPCO (Northwestern Auto Parts Company) "Powr-Pak" four-wheel drive conversion could be factory ordered.

1960: The Chevrolet and GMC C/K-Series replaced the line.

Variants

Cameo Carrier/Suburban Pickup

The mid-1955 introduction of Chevrolet's Cameo Carrier pickup truck helped pave the way for the Fleetside. The Cameo offered an array of car-like features that included passenger-car styling, fiberglass rear fenders, two-tone paint, a relatively luxurious interior, as well as an optional V8 engine, automatic transmission, and power assists. As always, there was a GMC version offered during the same time, called the GMC Suburban, with the same features offered on the Chevrolet. In 1957, a special version was made for GMC to be shown at national car shows called the Palomino, which had a Pontiac  V8 installed, borrowed from the 1957 Star Chief.

 

Other pickup truck producers, including Dodge, Ford, Studebaker, and International, began to offer flush-side cargo boxes on some of their 1957 models, such as the Dodge C Series, and the 1960 Studebaker Champ. 
Though GM replaced the Cameo Carrier and Suburban with the Fleetside and Wideside before the '50's were over, in time, pickup trucks with flush bodies and wider beds would become the dominant standard throughout the industry.

Utility vehicles  

The Task Force trucks formed the basis of the fourth-generation Chevrolet Suburban/GMC Carryall.  Competing against the International Travelall and the Dodge Town Panel and Town Wagon, the Suburban became a Chevrolet nameplate (as GMC adopted the Carryall nameplate). 

While marketed solely as a two-door utility wagon, the Suburban was offered in -ton 3100 and a 1-ton 3800 Suburban panel van was offered as an option. -ton 3600 Suburbans and Panel trucks were not available. Unlike the Advance Design-era trucks, there were no Canopy Express models offered.

References

Task Force
Motor vehicles manufactured in the United States
Pickup trucks
Rear-wheel-drive vehicles
Cars introduced in 1955
1960s cars